Franz Allers (August 6, 1905 - January 26, 1995) was a European-American conductor of ballet, opera, Broadway musicals, film scores, and symphony orchestras.

Early life
Franz Allers was born in Carlsbad, Austria-Hungary (now Czech Republic) in 1905. He started playing the violin at the age of 7. In 1920, he moved to Berlin, where he became a violinist in the Berlin Philharmonic. He had a distinguished career in Europe as an opera and symphonic conductor.

Career
In 1947, Allers conducted the original Broadway production of Brigadoon. He conducted the original 1951 Broadway production of Paint Your Wagon. He was the music director for My Darlin' Aida the following year, and in 1954 he conducted the score for the animated film Hansel & Gretel. Allers conducted the score to the original Broadway production of My Fair Lady in 1957, and would go on to win the Tony Award for Best Conductor and Musical Director.

Allers received a nomination at the 1960 Grammy Awards in the category of Best Recording for Children for the film soundtrack of Hansel & Gretel. However, Allers lost out to Peter Ustinov's Peter & the Wolf (with Herbert von Karajan conducting the Philharmonia Orchestra).

In 1961, Allers conducted the original Broadway production of Camelot, which won him a second Tony Award for Best Conductor and Musical Director. On October 1, 1961, a German translation of My Fair Lady opened at the Theater des Westens in Berlin, conducted by Allers.

Personal life 
Allers moved to the United States in 1938. He met his first wife, singer Carolyn Shaffer, in Chicago in 1939. While working on Broadway, Allers, his wife and their daughter, Carol, lived in Riverdale, New York. In later life, he moved back to Germany and lived in Munich with his second wife, German actress/playwright Janne Furch-Allers (née Ertel). She died in 1992 at the age of 76.

In 1995, Allers died from complications from pneumonia at the Desert Springs Hospital in Las Vegas, Nevada while traveling to California. He was 89.

According to his New York Times obituary, "Allers, along with the conductor Maurice Abravanel, 'completely revised the standards of Broadway pit work,' demanding the highest quality from both the orchestra players and the singers."

Awards and nominations
 1957 Tony Award for Best Conductor and Musical Director – My Fair Lady
 1960 Grammy Award nomination for Best Recording for Children – Hansel & Gretel
 1961 Tony Award for Best Conductor and Musical Director – Camelot

References

External links

American male conductors (music)
Tony Award winners
1905 births
1995 deaths
20th-century American conductors (music)
20th-century American male musicians
Czechoslovak emigrants to the United States